The 2018 SEC women's soccer tournament was the postseason women's soccer tournament for the SEC. The Texas A&M Aggies were the defending champions, but they were eliminated from the 2018 tournament with a 2–1 loss to the South Carolina Gamecocks in the quarterfinals. The LSU Tigers won the tournament title via a penalty kick shootout win over the Arkansas Razorbacks in the final. This was the first SEC women's soccer tournament title for LSU, and the first for coach Brian Lee.

Qualification 

The top ten teams earned a berth into the SEC Tournament. The tournament is held at Orange Beach Sportsplex in Orange Beach, Alabama.

Bracket

Schedule 

All matches are played at Orange Beach Sportsplex in Orange Beach, Alabama.

First Round

Quarterfinals

Semifinals

Final

Statistics

Goalscorers

All-Tournament team

MVP in boldSource:

See also 

 Southeastern Conference
 2018 NCAA Division I women's soccer season
 2018 NCAA Division I Women's Soccer Tournament

References

Tournament
SEC Women's Soccer Tournament